Patrick Muldoon (born September 27, 1968) is an American actor, film producer, and musician.

Early life and education
Muldoon was born in San Pedro, California, the son of Deanna, a homemaker, and William Patrick Muldoon II, a personal injury lawyer. He is of Irish descent on his father's side and of Croatian descent on his mother's side. He attended Loyola High School, a Jesuit school. Muldoon graduated in 1991 from the University of Southern California, where he was a member of the Sigma Chi fraternity and played tight end on the USC Trojans football team.

Career
Muldoon was the first actor to play the role of Austin Reed on Days of Our Lives, from 1992 to 1995 and again from September 2011 to July 2012. Prior to that, he landed a role on the popular teen television series Saved by the Bell in 1991.

During the '90s, Muldoon became the only actor ever to hold an exclusive development deal with Spelling Entertainment.  Muldoon co-produced programming with Spelling Television's vice president Tony Shepherd, and their television development began with the USA Petite Model Show created by actress-model Ann Lauren. The show was filmed on-location at Caesar's Palace Las Vegas on the renowned Colosseum Circus Maximus Showroom stage, in The Forum Shops and sponsored by Cartier. The televised special was co-hosted by Patrick Muldoon and Ann Lauren with special guest co-star Audrey Landers of Dallas and broadcast on WWOR and WGN Superstations distributed by Spelling Television Worldvision.

Muldoon's roles include playing the popular villain Richard Hart on the primetime soap opera Melrose Place from 1995 to 1996.  He starred in Black Cat Run, which also marked the debut of director DJ Caruso (Disturbia, I am Number Four) with Frank Darabont. He also played Edmund in the Patsy Rodenburg production of King Lear. He played Zander Barcalow in the Paul Verhoeven-directed Starship Troopers. He has starred in many popular television movies and has been a regular in many films for the Lifetime & Hallmark channels.

In the past decade, he has also become a prolific film producer. In 2015, he produced and starred in Badge of Honor and in 2020, he appeared in Arkansas and The Comeback Trail.

Filmography

Film

Television

References

External links
 
 The official Sleeping Masses website

1968 births
Male actors from Los Angeles
American male film actors
American people of Croatian descent
American people of Irish descent
American male soap opera actors
American male television actors
Living people
People from San Pedro, Los Angeles
Players of American football from Los Angeles
USC Trojans football players
20th-century American male actors
21st-century American male actors